The Law and the Lady is a detective story, published in 1875 by Wilkie Collins. It is not quite as sensational in style as The Moonstone and The Woman in White.

Plot summary
Valeria Brinton marries Eustace Woodville despite objections from Woodville's family; this decision worries Valeria's family and friends.

Just a few days after the wedding, various incidents lead Valeria to suspect her husband of hiding a dark secret in his past. She discovers that he has been using a false name, "Woodville", when his true surname is "Macallan". Eustace refuses to discuss it, leading them to curtail their honeymoon and return to London where Valeria learns
that he was on trial for his first wife's murder by arsenic. He was tried in a Scottish court and the verdict was 'not proven' rather than 'not guilty'. This implies that, though the jury believe Eustace to be guilty, it did not have enough proof to convict him.

Valeria sets out to save their happiness by proving her husband innocent of the crime. In her quest, she comes across the disabled character Miserrimus Dexter, a fascinating but mentally unstable genius, and Dexter's devoted female cousin, Ariel. Dexter will prove crucial to uncovering the disturbing truth behind the mysterious death.

References

 Michael Diamond, Victorian Sensation (London: Anthem, 2003) p. 215–216

External links

 

1875 British novels
British mystery novels
Novels by Wilkie Collins